Acrobothriidae is a family of flatworms belonging to the order Spathebothriidea.

Genera:
 Bothrimonus Duvernoy, 1842
 Cyathocephalus Kessler, 1868
 Didymobothrium Nybelin, 1922
 Diplocotyle Diesing, 1850
 Diplocotyle Krabbe, 1874

References

Platyhelminthes